Jacques Almira (born Jacques Schaetzle in 1950) is a French writer, winner of the 1975 Prix Médicis.

Works 
1975: Le Voyage à Naucratis, Prix Médicis
1978: Le Passage du désir, Gallimard
1979: Le Marchand d'oublies, Gallimard
1984: Terrass Hôtel, Gallimard
1986: La Fuite à Constantinople, Prix des libraires
1988: Le Sémaphore, Gallimard
1990: Le Bal de la guerre ou la Vie de la princesse des Ursins, Gallimard
1991: La Reine des zoulous, Mercure de France
1992: Le Bar de la mer, Gallimard
1993: Le Manège, Gallimard
1998: Le Salon des apogées ou la Vie du prince Eugène de Savoie, Gallimard
2002: La Norme,

References

External links 
 Jacques Almira on Babelio
 Almira Jacques on Languedoc Roussillon Livre et Lecture
 Jacques ALMIRA on INA.fr
 Jacques Almira l'amoureux des stars on INA.fr (18 August 1978)

20th-century French non-fiction writers
20th-century French male writers
21st-century French non-fiction writers
Prix Médicis winners
Prix des libraires winners
1950 births
Living people
21st-century French male writers